Pareto may refer to:

People
 Vilfredo Pareto (1848–1923), Italian economist, political scientist, and philosopher, works named for him include:
 Pareto analysis, a statistical analysis tool in problem solving
Pareto distribution, a power-law probability distribution
Pareto efficiency
Pareto front, the set of all Pareto efficient solutions
Pareto principle, or the 80-20 rule
 Bartolomeo Pareto, medieval priest and cartographer from Genoa
 Graziella Pareto (1889–1973), Catalan soprano 
 Lorenzo Pareto (1800–1865), Italian geologist and statesman
 Paula Pareto (born 1986), Argentine judoka
 Benedetto Pareto, builder of the Shrine of Nostra Signora della Guardia in Liguria, Italy

Other uses
 Pareto, Piedmont, a town in Italy
 Pareto Group, a Norwegian finance company

See also 

 Paret, a surname
 Pereto, a town in Italy
 Perito, a town in Italy

Italian-language surnames